Sweden are one of the major teams in international speedway. They have been managed by Mats Olsson, who is currently in his 2nd spell, since 2005 after he quit in 2000. The current captain is  2000 World Under-21 Champion Andreas Jonsson.

Speedway World Cup 
The Sweden national speedway team has won the Speedway World Team Cup and Speedway World Cup on 10 occasions and were a major force in the opening years of the tournament, winning 4 out of the first 5, between 1960 and 1964. Key riding members of the title wins include Ove Fundin (6 wins), Rune Sörmander, Björn Knutsson, Göte Nordin (4 wins), Sören Sjösten, Tony Rickardsson, Peter Karlsson and Mikael Max (also known as Mikael Karlsson) (3 wins). The cup eluded them for 23 years between 1971 and 1993, but they regained the trophy in 1994 when Sweden were the winners of a reformatted event involving pairs (Tony Rickardsson, Henrik Gustafsson and Mikael Karlsson) rather than teams, though this format was only to last until 1998. They also went on to win in 2003 and 2004.

Sweden bookended the original World Team Cup, winning the inaugural final at the Ullevi Stadium at home in Göteborg in 1960 before winning the last World Team Cup in 2000 at the Brandon Stadium in Coventry, England.

Team U-21 World Championship 

* Due to cost of travel and visa problems, Sweden withdrew from the 2011 Final,

Team U-19 European Championship

Honours

World Championships

European Championships

Titles

Famous Swedish riders 

 Henrik Gustafsson
 Ove Fundin
 Conny Iversson
 Bengt Jansson
 Tommy Jansson
 Andreas Jonsson
 Per Jonsson
 Peter Karlsson
 Niklas Klingberg
 Björn Knutsson
 Antonio Lindback
 Christer Löfqvist
 Mikael Max
 Anders Michanek
 Peter Nahlin
 Jimmy Nilsen
 Göte Nordin
 Tony Olsson
 Bernt Persson
 Tony Rickardsson
 Sören Sjösten
 Rune Sörmander
 Erik Stenlund

National speedway teams
National sports teams of Sweden
National team
!
!